Rutshuru is a town located in the North Kivu province of the eastern Democratic Republic of the Congo, and is headquarters of an administrative district, the Rutshuru Territory. The town lies in the western branch of the Albertine Rift between Lakes Edward and Kivu. The Ugandan border is 15 km east and the Rwandan border is 30 km south-east. 
Lava flows from the Nyamuragira volcano, 40 km south-west, have come within 7 km of the town in recent years.

It is the largest town formerly controlled by the rebel National Congress for the Defence of the People faction. As of November 2012, the town was a stronghold of the rebel, or self-styled 'revolutionary' March 23 Movement. After the defeat of the M23 Movement the town was retaken by the Congolese army, and President Joseph Kabila paid a visit to the town in November 2013 after driving from Kisangani.

Rwandan Genocide and Congo Wars

Rutshuru has a pre-colonial Congolese Hutu population, and following the Rwandan genocide large numbers of Rwandan Hutu refugees were housed in camps there. The First and Second Congo Wars saw much fighting in the district involving Ugandan, Rwandan and Congolese forces of various factions. Since the official end of the war in 2002/3, fighting has periodically erupted between militias allied to the Hutu and Tutsi. The town has always been occupied by proxy forces linked to Rwandan president Paul Kagame and has since the advent of the Rwandan genocide been the focal of troubles between Tutsi and Hutu with stakes in Rwanda. At the onset of all the Rwanda's invasion of Congo, Tutsi troops loyal to Kagame have been linked to massive looting and mass rapes of Congolese locals. Rutshuru much like most of the DR Congo eastern region is a town of collateral damage from infighting between Rwandan proxies and local populations.

Mining

The Lueshe mine is located in the Territoire de Rutshuru, north of Rutshuru town, exploiting one of the world's biggest reserves of pyrochlore, an ore of niobium. It is said to be the most valuable mineral resource of the eastern Congo but the mine has been officially closed for some years due to disputes over ownership of mining rights, the instability of the region, and the need to rehabilitate the mining equipment. Smuggling of pyrochlore by rebels under Laurent Nkunda is said to take place across the border into Rwanda. There are approximately 15 gold mining sites in and around Rutshuru.

Features and attractions
Rutshuru Falls
May-Ya-Moto volcano and hot springs, 32 km north-north-west
Virunga National Park
Lake Kirwa, a small crater lake 10 km south-west

References

Further reading
https://www.german-foreign-policy.com/en/news/detail/3970/

Populated places in North Kivu